Svenska Cupen 2005 was the fiftieth season of the main Swedish football Cup. The competition started on 20 March 2005 and concluded on 29 November 2005 with the Final, held at Råsunda Stadium, Solna Municipality in Stockholms län. Djurgårdens IF won the final 2–0 against Åtvidabergs FF.

First round
The 32 matches were played between 20 March and 14 April 2005. There were 68 teams in the first round from Division 1, Division 2 and Division 3, but also including a few teams from Division 4 and Division 5.

!colspan="3"|20 March 2005

|-
!colspan="3"|28 March 2005

|-
!colspan="3"|2 April 2005

|-
!colspan="3"|3 April 2005

|-
!colspan="3"|6 April 2005

|-
!colspan="3"|9 April 2005

|-
!colspan="3"|10 April 2005

|-
!colspan="3"|14 April 2005

|}

Second round
In this round the 32 winning teams from the previous round were joined by 32 teams from Allsvenskan and Superettan.  The 32 matches were played between 19 April and 21 April 2005.

!colspan="3"|19 April 2005
 
 
 
|-
!colspan="3"|20 April 2005
 
 
 
 
 
 
 
 
 
 
 
 
 
 
 
 
 
 
|-
!colspan="3"|21 April 2005
 

 
 
 
 
 
 
 
 
 
|}

Third round
The 16 matches in this round were played between 4 May and 19 May 2005.

!colspan="3"|4 May 2005

|-
!colspan="3"|5 May 2005

|-
!colspan="3"|19 May 2005

|}

Fourth round
The 8 matches in this round were played between 1 June and 13 July 2005.

!colspan="3"|1 June 2005

|-
!colspan="3"|7 June 2005

|-
!colspan="3"|9 June 2005

|-
!colspan="3"|10 June 2005

|-
!colspan="3"|30 June 2005

|-
!colspan="3"|7 July 2005

|-
!colspan="3"|13 July 2005

|}

Quarter-finals
The 4 matches in this round were played between 22 July and 4 August 2005.

!colspan="3"|22 July 2005

|-
!colspan="3"|3 August 2005

|-
!colspan="3"|4 August 2005

|}

Semi-finals
The semi-finals were played on 8 September and 22 September 2005.

!colspan="3"|8 September 2005

|-
!colspan="3"|22 September 2005

|}

Final

The final was played on 29 October 2005 at the Råsunda Stadium.

Footnotes

External links 
  Svenska Cupen 2005 - Svenskfotboll.se - Official Website
  Svenska Cupen 2005 – everysport.com
  Sweden Cup 2005 - rsssf.com

2005
Cupen
2005 domestic association football cups